Ramona Forever is a humorous children's novel written by Beverly Cleary. The seventh book in the Ramona Quimby series, it continues the story of Ramona, her older sister, Beezus, and their family. They are finally old enough to stay home together, and they work hard to get along. Mrs. Quimby is expecting a baby and Aunt Bea gets engaged in a book that sees Ramona coping with growing up. It was originally published in 1984.

Plot summary
The book takes place some months after the events of Ramona Quimby, Age 8. Ramona is curious to meet her friend Howie's uncle, Uncle Hobart, who has just returned from Saudi Arabia. She meets him one day after school at the Kemps' house, but when he teases her, she quickly decides she dislikes him. Hobart gives Howie a unicycle, and Howie's younger sister Willa Jean an accordion. Willa Jean breaks the accordion before Ramona has the chance to stop her, but Mrs. Kemp, their grandmother, punishes Ramona anyway. Hurt and angry, Ramona tells her parents that she no longer wants to go to the Kemps' house after school, and that Mrs. Kemp singles her out. When Beezus agrees that Mrs. Kemp dislikes them both, the sisters convince their parents to let them stay home after school for one week to see how it goes.

At first, all goes well, but when Beezus won't let Ramona go out and ride Howie's bike, Ramona gets mad and calls her "Pizzaface". Even though Ramona meant it as a play on "Pieface", Beezus thinks this is about her acne, and refuses to help Ramona after she scrapes her knee. The next day, they find their cat, Picky-Picky, dead in the basement. They bury Picky-Picky, hold a funeral for him, and forgive each other for the fight. When their parents return home, they decide the sisters are responsible enough to take care of themselves; they then announce that Mrs. Quimby is pregnant, leaving Beezus thrilled and Ramona with mixed feelings.

Summer rolls around. Mr. Quimby is almost finished with college and hopes to get a teaching job in the area, but when the only job he's offered turns out to be in rural Oregon (which would force the family to move), he instead finds work managing one of the Shop-Rite supermarkets in Portland. Meanwhile, Ramona's Aunt Beatrice and Uncle Hobart get engaged. At first, they don't plan to have a wedding, but when Beezus insists, the group plans a wedding in only two weeks. When the wedding arrives, the wedding ring is stitched too tightly onto the pillow, and goes flying when Howie's father yanks on it; Ramona sees the ring on the heel of Aunt Beatrice's shoe, retrieves it, and saves the wedding.

Not long after the wedding, Mrs. Quimby gives birth to her youngest daughter, Roberta Day Quimby. While Beezus is able to visit their mother and Roberta, Ramona is a few years too young to visit the maternity ward. Later, though, when Mrs. Quimby returns from the hospital, Ramona finally meets Roberta. On the car ride home, she realizes that no matter how big or challenging the coming changes are, she's "winning at growing up".

Critical reception

Kirkus Reviews gave the book a starred review, for "books of remarkable merit", saying, "It's a measure of Cleary's talent and acumen that the Quimbys are as credible in the mid-1980s as they were in the mid-1950s."

Characters
 Ramona Quimby - The novel's protagonist, who is 8 years old and in the third grade.
 Beatrice "Beezus" Quimby - Ramona's older sister, who is 13 years old and in the eighth grade.
 Robert Quimby - Ramona and Beezus' father.
 Dorothy Quimby - Ramona and Beezus' mother. 
 Howard "Howie" Kemp - Ramona's friend since nursery school in Beezus and Ramona, who becomes her cousin-in-law.
 Aunt Beatrice "Aunt Bea" - The girls' aunt and Dorothy's sister. First introduced in Beezus and Ramona. A fourth-grade teacher.
 Hobart Kemp - Howie's rich uncle who marries Aunt Bea and becomes the girls' uncle in the ninth chapter.  
 Willa Jean Kemp - Howie's messy little sister.
 Picky Picky - The Quimbys' cat who dies at the age of 10 in the fourth chapter. 
 Roberta Quimby - The girls' new baby sister who is born in the last chapter.

Adaptations, editions
Ramona and Beezus: a movie starring Joey King as Ramona and Selena Gomez as Beezus. It was released on July 23, 2010. Although it jumps from book to book, the plot mainly focuses on this book.

Audio Formats: The book is available in cassette, CD and eAudiobok from Random House/Listening Library; VHs tape from Atlantis Films/Ramona Productions;

Print/English: Braille available from Dell, large print books through Dell, and e-Books through HarperCollins;

Print/Worldwide: As of 2010, 109 editions of the book had been published in 9 languages.

See also

References

External links
 The World of Beverly Cleary

1984 American novels
American children's novels
American novels adapted into films
Novels by Beverly Cleary
Novels set in Portland, Oregon
1984 children's books